Wysoka  is a village in the administrative district of Gmina Boleszkowice, within Myślibórz County, West Pomeranian Voivodeship, in north-western Poland, close to the German border.

The village has a population of 297.

References

Wysoka